Matthew Edward Patricia (born September 13, 1974) is an American football coach who is the senior football advisor for the New England Patriots of the National Football League (NFL). He has served 15 non-consecutive seasons as an assistant coach with the Patriots, including six seasons as the team's defensive coordinator from 2012 to 2017. Patricia won three Super Bowls with the Patriots, two as defensive coordinator, and presided over a defense in 2016 that led the league in fewest points allowed. In 2022, he served as the Patriots' offensive playcaller. In between his New England tenure, he was the head coach of the Detroit Lions from 2018 to 2020.

Playing career
Patricia played at Rensselaer Polytechnic Institute (RPI) where he was a four-year letterman as a center and guard with the Engineers football team from 1992 to 1995.

Coaching career

Early coaching career
Patricia remained at RPI to begin his coaching career as a graduate assistant in 1996. He spent the next two years as an application engineer with Hoffman Air & Filtration Systems in East Syracuse, New York. After graduating, Patricia received an offer to maintain nuclear submarines and aircraft carriers with the Westinghouse Electric Company, but decided to return to football as the defensive line coach for Amherst College from 1999 to 2000. In 2001, he moved to Syracuse University as an offensive graduate assistant for the team, a position he held for three seasons.

New England Patriots
Patricia joined the Patriots under head coach Bill Belichick as an offensive coaching assistant in 2004, the same year the team won its 3rd Super Bowl in Super Bowl XXXIX. In 2005, upon the departure of assistant offensive line/tight ends coach Jeff Davidson, Patricia was reassigned as the Patriots' assistant offensive line coach. Then-linebackers coach Dean Pees was promoted to defensive coordinator after the season, prompting another reassignment for Patricia, this time to linebackers coach for the 2006 season. Patricia was named the team's safeties coach in 2011. In 2012, he was promoted to the title of defensive coordinator, though he had been calling the plays on defense since the departure of Pees following the 2009 season. In January 2016, the Patriots gave permission for Patricia to interview for the head-coaching position of the Cleveland Browns, but Patricia would remain with the Patriots as defensive coordinator going into the 2016 season. The Patriots won three Super Bowls with Patricia: Super Bowl XXXIX at the end of the 2004 season, Super Bowl XLIX at the end of the 2014 season, and Super Bowl LI at the end of the 2016 season. On January 1, 2018 (NFL Black Monday), it was revealed that Patricia was the subject of the Detroit Lions' and New York Giants' head coaching searches. To date, he is the Patriots' most recent defensive playcaller to receive the title of defensive coordinator.

Detroit Lions

On February 5, 2018, Patricia was named the head coach of the Detroit Lions. He lost his first two games of the 2018 season, the first against the New York Jets, 48–17, on Monday Night Football on September 10, and the following week against the San Francisco 49ers, 30–27, on September 16. His first win as a head coach came on September 23, 2018, a 26–10 victory against his previous team, the New England Patriots, with Patricia beating his old mentor, Bill Belichick, in the process. It was also the Lions' first win over the Patriots since 2000, which was Belichick's first year coaching the Patriots.

Under Patricia, the Lions posted a 6–10 record in 2018 and had a dismal 3–12–1 season in 2019. Both marked a regression from Patricia's predecessor Jim Caldwell, who posted a 9–7 record in 2017 before he was fired in favor of Patricia. Despite the record and decline, team owner Martha Firestone Ford and her soon-to-be successor Sheila Ford Hamp announced after the season that they would give Patricia a chance to show improvement in the 2020 season.

On November 28, 2020, Patricia and general manager Bob Quinn were both fired by the Lions. This came after much criticism about Patricia's abilities. The firing happened after the 4–5 Lions suffered back-to-back lopsided losses to drop to 4–7: a 20–0 loss to the Carolina Panthers on November 22 (the first time the Lions had been shut out since 2009) and a 41–25 loss to the Houston Texans during the Lions annual Thanksgiving Day game on November 26. Patricia finished his tenure in Detroit with a  record in two and a half seasons. The Lions finished last in the NFC North division in both of Patricia's full seasons and were in last place at the time of his firing.

New England Patriots (second stint)
On January 22, 2021, it was reported that Patricia would be returning to the Patriots "in a variety of roles". The exact roles were not specified, but it is reported that Patriots coach Bill Belichick and Patricia are working out a role similar to what Mike Lombardi had in New England, though it is still a work in progress. In addition, Patricia is expected to work on projects as well as be a resource to Belichick. On July 21, 2022, the Patriots announced that Patricia will be senior football advisor and offensive line coach. Throughout the 2022 season, Patricia served as the offensive play caller.  Patricia was relieved of his duties as offensive playcaller after the 2022 season where the offense regressed to an average of 18.1 points per game, though he was retained as a football advisor.

Head coaching record

Personal life
Patricia married his wife, Raina, in 2009.

1996 sexual assault indictment
In May 2018, his hire as Detroit Lions head coach received public scrutiny when reporters discovered he had been indicted for sexual assault in 1996. In response, Detroit Lions team president Rod Wood initially stated "I don't know anything about this," but a few hours later said, "I am very comfortable with the process of interviewing and employing Matt. I will tell you with 1,000-percent certainty that everything I've learned confirmed what I already knew about the man and would have no way changed our decision to make him our head coach." Patricia was ultimately not tried, as the charges were dismissed, after the victim refused to testify.

References

External links
 New England Patriots Profile archived April 28, 2017
 Detroit Lions Profile

1974 births
Living people
American football offensive linemen
Amherst Mammoths football coaches
Detroit Lions head coaches
National Football League defensive coordinators
New England Patriots coaches
People from Oneida County, New York
RPI Engineers football coaches
RPI Engineers football players
Syracuse Orange football coaches
American people of Italian descent